Sue Gibson may refer to:

 Sue Gibson (skier) (born 1955), alpine skier from New Zealand
 Sue Gibson (cinematographer) (1952–2016), British cinematographer
 Sue Gibson (chemist) (born 1960), British research chemist
Sue Gibson (javelin thrower), Canadian javelin athlete